Men Yang (born 20 February 1991 in Luoyang) is a Chinese football player who currently plays for China League One side Suzhou Dongwu.

Club career
His father is former footballer Men Wenfeng and he would start his football career with the Chengdu Blades youth team before going abroad where he joined Hungary football club Ferencváros. He would be promoted to the Ferencváros senior team in the 2009–10 Nemzeti Bajnokság I league season. The club did not extend his contract and Men Yang returned to China where on 25 March 2011 he joined top-tier club Changchun Yatai for the start of the 2011 Chinese Super League campaign. Under Head coach Shen Xiangfu he would make his debut in a league game on 21 August 2011 against Jiangsu Sainty F.C. in a 1–0 victory.

The following season he would join newly promoted team Guangzhou R&F on 11 February 2012. He would make his first appearance on 7 October 2012 against his former club Changchun Yatai in a league game that ended in a 2–1 defeat. After the game Men Yang struggled to establish himself within the team and did not represent the senior throughout the whole of the next season. To gain some playing time he was loaned out to third tier football club Yinchuan Helanshan for the 2014 China League Two campaign.

In March 2016 Men Yang transferred to third tier football club Lijiang Jiayunhao on a free transfer. In his debut season with the club they would go on to win the division title and promotion to the second tier at the end of the 2016 China League Two campaign. In the next league campaign he was unable to ensure the clubs survival within the league and they were relegated at the end of the 2017 China League One campaign.

He would join third tier club Shenzhen Ledman for the 2018 China League Two league season, however they disbanded at the end of the campaign. He would be free to join Zibo Cuju for the 2019 China League Two season. His following season with the club would see them come runners-up and gain promotion into the second tier.

Career statistics
.

Honours

Club
Lijiang Jiayunhao
 China League Two: 2016

References

External links

Player profile at sodasoccer.com
Yang on Ferencvarosi Torna Club Official Website 

1991 births
Living people
Sportspeople from Luoyang
Chinese footballers
Chinese expatriate footballers
Footballers from Henan
Association football forwards
Ferencvárosi TC footballers
Changchun Yatai F.C. players
Yunnan Flying Tigers F.C. players
Guangzhou City F.C. players
Nemzeti Bajnokság I players
Chinese Super League players
China League One players
Expatriate footballers in Hungary